Onur Recep Kıvrak (born 1 January 1988) is a Turkish former professional footballer who played as a goalkeeper. He played for Trabzonspor before his announcement of retirement from professional football in January 2019.

Although he does not necessarily claim, he is known in Turkish football environment as "Kelebek".

Club career
Kıvrak signed for Trabzonspor on 15 January 2008. On 6 December 2013, Kıvrak renewed his contract on 2.5€m annual salary, keeping him at the club until the end of 2017–18 season.

On 2 October 2014, during Europa League match against Legia Warsaw Kıvrak tore cruciate ligaments in his left knee and was subbed off. 15 days after the injury, Kıvrak underwent knee surgery and was ruled out for the rest of 2014–15 season. He could return to trainings on 8 May 2015.

Contract between Trabzonspor and Kıvrak was mutually terminated on 7 January 2019. Kıvrak announced to local media in Trabzon that he will retire from professional football on 9 January 2019. He mentioned that he will move to Izmir and that he will never return to Trabzon, in an interview to local newspaper. He was linked with local Izmir clubs Altay S.K. and Karşıyaka S.K. during 2019 winter transfer window.

International career
Onur made his debut in the 2–0 friendly win against Northern Ireland on 26 May 2010, having worked his way through the youth teams at U-16, U-17, U-18, U-19, and U-21 level.

He is part of the Turkish national team for Euro 2016.

Statistics

Club
.

1.Includes Turkish Cup.
2.Includes Turkish Super Cup.
3.Includes UEFA Champions League and UEFA Cup/Europa League.

International
:

Honours

Trabzonspor
Turkish Cup (1): 2009–10
Turkish Super Cup (1): 2010

References

External links

 
 
 
 
 

1988 births
Living people
People from Alaşehir
Turkish footballers
Turkey international footballers
Turkey under-21 international footballers
Süper Lig players
Karşıyaka S.K. footballers
Trabzonspor footballers
Association football goalkeepers
Turkey youth international footballers
UEFA Euro 2016 players